Thorney Abbey, now the Church of St Mary and St Botolph, was a medieval monastic house established on the island of Thorney in The Fens of Cambridgeshire, England.

History 
The earliest documentary sources refer to a mid-7th century hermitage destroyed by a Viking incursion in the late 9th century. A Benedictine monastery was founded in the 970s, and a huge rebuilding programme followed the Norman Conquest of 1066. A new church was begun under the abbacy of Gunther of Le Mans, appointed in 1085. It was in use by 1089, but not entirely finished until 1108. Henry I was a benefactor of the abbey; a writ  of his survives ordering the return of the manor of Sawbridge in Warwickshire  to the abbey "and there is to be no complaint of injustice".

The focus of the settlement shifted away from the fen edge in the late 12th or early 13th century, the earlier site becoming a rubbish dump, perhaps because of encroaching water. It was reoccupied in the 13th and 14th centuries, when clay layers were laid down to provide a firm foundation for the timber buildings. More substantial buildings were erected in the 16th century and these are thought to have been part of an expanding abbey complex, perhaps for use as guesthouses, stables, or  workshops.

Many of Thorney Abbey's buildings disappeared without trace after the Dissolution of the Monasteries. Its last abbot, Robert Blythe, was a supporter of the King, having signed a letter to the pope urging that his divorce should be allowed. He was rewarded with a pension of £200 a year. The abbey was surrendered to the king's commissioners on 1 December 1539, and most its buildings were later demolished and the stone reused. The site was granted to John Russell, 1st Earl of Bedford in 1549/50.

At this date the aisles were demolished and the arcade openings walled up. Some stained glass was installed that possibly came from the Steelyard, the London trading base of the Hanseatic League. The present east end, in the Norman style, is by Edward Blore, and dates from 1840 to 1841. The church is a Grade I listed building.

There is a model of the monastery in the Thorney Museum.

The name Thorney Abbey is also given to a Grade I listed house, partly late sixteenth and partly seventeenth century, in the village of Thorney.

Burials
As a large abbey of Anglo-Saxon England a number of saints have been buried and venerated in Thorney, including:
Athwulf of Thorney
Benedict Biscop
Botwulf of Thorney
Cissa of Crowland
Herefrith of Thorney
Huna of Thorney
Tancred of Thorney 9th century East Anglian martyr
Torthred of Thorney brother of Tancred
Tova
Wihtred of Thorney
Albinus of Thorney an Anglo-Saxon bishop and saint, buried in Thorney.

Excavation 
Excavation was undertaken in 2002 prior to redevelopment, by University of Leicester Archaeological Services. This focused on the northern edge of the former island. As well as pottery, animal bone and roofing material, a large deposit of 13th and 14th century painted glass was found in and around the buildings. The intricate designs were of very high quality.

See also
List of English abbeys, priories and friaries serving as parish churches

Sources 
 Thomas, J. (2006). Thorney Abbey discovered? Current Archaeology 204: 619

References

External links 

 Parish of Thorney in the City of Peterborough
 Abbey of Thorney from VCH
 Thorney Abbey - Catholic Encyclopedia
 The Calendar and the Cloister, website dedicated to Oxford, St John's College MS 17, an early 12th-century manuscript produced at Thorney Abbey.

Christian monasteries established in the 7th century
7th-century establishments in England
Anglo-Saxon monastic houses
9th-century disestablishments in England
10th-century establishments in England
972 establishments
1539 disestablishments in England
Buildings and structures in Peterborough
Monasteries in Cambridgeshire
Benedictine monasteries in England
Grade I listed churches in Cambridgeshire
Grade I listed monasteries
Edward Blore buildings
Churches in Peterborough